Ses plus grands succès is a 2000 greatest hits album by Joe Dassin.

Track listing

Charts

References

External links 
 Joe Dassin – Ses plus grands succès on Discogs

2000 greatest hits albums
Joe Dassin albums
Sony Music albums